{{speciesbox
|name = Mountain tea-tree
|image = Tea Tree Bairne Track.jpg
|image_caption = Leptospermum grandifolium in Ku-ring-gai Chase National Park
|genus = Leptospermum
|species = grandifolium
|authority = Sm. 
|synonyms = 
 Leptospermum lanigerum var. grandifolium (Sm.]) Hook.f. 
 Leptospermum grandifolium Sm. var. grandifolium 
 Leptospermum lanigerum var. grandifolia Hook.f. orth. var.
 Leptospermum lanigerum var. grandifolium (Sm.) Hook.f. 
 Leptospermum pubescens var. grandifolium (Sm.) Domin 
 Leptospermum subargenteum Gand.
|range_map = Leptospermum grandifoliumDistA26.png
|range_map_caption = Occurrence data from AVH
}}

The Leptospermum grandifolium, commonly known as mountain tea-tree or woolly teatree, is a species of shrub or small tree that is endemic to south-eastern Australia. It has elliptical to egg-shaped leaves with a sharp point on the tip, white flowers and relatively large, broadly hemispherical fruit. 

There are broad, pale brownish bracts and bracteoles at the base of the flower bud.

Taxonomy and namingLeptospermum grandifolium was first formally described in 1802 by James Edward Smith in Transactions of the Linnean Society of London.

Distribution and habitat
Mountain tea-tree is found in the eastern half of Victoria, in the Australian Capital Territory and in south eastern New South Wales as far north as the Hawkesbury River. It grows in swamps, along rocky streams and on sheltered slopes from the coast to subalpine parts of Mount Kosciuszko.

CultivationLeptospermum grandifolium is one of several Leptospermum'' species which are valued in cultivation. It is a recipient of the Royal Horticultural Society's Award of Garden Merit.

References

Flora of New South Wales
Flora of Victoria (Australia)
grandifolium
Myrtales of Australia
Flora of the Australian Capital Territory